Mauna Loa Solar Observatory (MLSO) is a solar observatory located on the slopes of Mauna Loa on the island of Hawaii in the U.S. state of Hawaii.  It is operated by the High Altitude Observatory (HAO), a laboratory within the National Center for Atmospheric Research (NCAR).  The MLSO sits on property managed by the Mauna Loa Observatory (MLO), which is part of the U.S. Department of Commerce National Oceanic and Atmospheric Administration (NOAA). MLSO was built in 1965.

The MLSO is tasked with monitoring the solar atmosphere and recording data on plasmic and energetic emissions from the chromosphere and corona.  Studies of coronal mass ejections (CMEs) are also conducted at MLSO.  A number of non-solar astronomical observatories are located at the site.  The MLSO instruments record images of the solar disk and limb every 3 minutes for 3–10 hours daily starting at 17:00 UT, weather permitting.

Instruments

Current instruments

 The Coronal Multi-channel Polarimeter (CoMP) monitors the magnetic field in the corona by recording the strength and polarization of light received from corona.
 The K-cor coronagraph is the 5 generation instrument to produces polarization maps of the corona observed in white light.

Former instruments
 The Precision Solar Photometric Telescope (PSPT) produces highly accurate images of the photosphere at five different wavelengths.
 The Mark-IV K-Coronameter (Mk4) produces polarization maps of the corona observed in white light.
 The Advanced Coronal Observing System (ACOS) is a set of instruments for monitoring the chromosphere on a shared mount.
 The Coronado Solarmax 60 (CS60) is a small refractor built by Meade Instruments which provides  H-alpha disk and limb images.
 Chromospheric Helium-I Imaging Photometer (CHIP) observes at a wavelength which is an emission line for non-ionized helium (He I) in order to monitor the chromosphere.
 The Polarimeter for Inner Coronal Studies (PICS) produced H-alpha disk and limb digital images from 1994 to 1997.  It was replaced by the CS60.
 The Digital Prominence Monitor (DPM) produced H-alpha disk and limb digital images from 1994 to 1997.  It was replaced by the PICS.
 The Prominence Monitor (PMON) produced H-alpha disk and limb images on film from 1980 to 1994.  It was replaced by the DPM.
 The Mark-III K-Coronameter (Mk3) operated from 1980 to 1998, and was replaced by the MK4.
  The Mark-II K-Coronameter (MK2), named the Coronal Activity Monitor, operated from 1968 to 1980.  It was developed specifically for study of minute-to-minute transient coronal phenomena.
  The Mark-I K-Coronameter (MK1) was brought over from Haleakala in 1965 (where the observing program had been carried out in collaboration with the University of Hawaii), and operated on Mauna Loa until 1968.

See also
 Mauna Kea Observatories
 List of solar telescopes
 List of astronomical observatories

References

External links
 High Altitude Observatory
 National Center for Atmospheric Research

Mauna Loa
Astronomical observatories in Hawaii
Buildings and structures in Hawaii County, Hawaii
Solar observatories